Hemistola kezukai is a species of moth in the family Geometridae. It is found in Taiwan.

References

Moths described in 1978
Hemitheini
Moths of Taiwan